Peeli Patti Aur Raja Jani Ki Gol Dunya (Urdu: پیلی پتی اور راجہ جانی کی گول دنیا) is the second album released by Pakistani pop/rock band, Noori. The album was released on 10 September 2005. Noori's singles from this album were "Nishaan", "Meray Log" and "Kuttay Te Tho Uttay".

Singles like "Kuttay Te tho Uttay" and "Nishaan" did well at music charts.

Concept
This second album by Noori was a follow up on where Suno Ke Main Hun Jawan left off. It talks about what happens when the ever so energetic and hopeful youth grows up and faces the realities of the world. The discontentment and suffering which arises in this growing up, creates an indifferent and self-centered individual, who finds escape routes in things like drugs and other short-lived pleasures.

Peeli Patti Aur Raja Jani Ki Gol Dunya is a call against such indifference. It depicts reality as it exists in our society today, and begs for a reconsideration of the direction people are carving out for themselves in these times of turmoil. Musically, the album brought out a darker and maturer side of the band – something they carried well with their new, don’t-give-a-damn image of long hair and beards. Apart from popularity, it brought a newfound respect for the band – not just as musicians but as individuals who cared for society and genuinely wanted to make a difference.

Their track, Kuttay received widespread criticism, and the music video was also banned from the local television channels. So a second video was made for the track. However, this track has given a new concept, by mixing rock music with Punjabi.

Track listing
All music composed & arranged by Ali Noor except for Jo Meray. Jo Meray composed by Ali Hamza.

Personnel
All information is taken from the CD.

Noori
 Ali Noor: lead vocals, lead guitar
 John "Gumby" Louis Pinto: drums
 Ali Hamza: rhythm, vocals
 Muhammad Ali Jafri: bass guitar

Additional musicians
 Backing vocals on "Ooncha" by: Ali Azmat
 Backing Vox on "Peeli Patti Aur Raja Jani": Mandana Zaidi
 Backing Vox on "Ooncha": Sasha Zaidi

Production
Produced by Ali Noor
Recorded & Mixed at Digital Fidelity Studios, Lahore, Punjab
Guitar sound engineer: Mekaal Hasan, Muhammad Ali Jafri
Assisted by Mekaal Hasan
Photography: Mandana Zaidi
Art direction & design: Atif Ghauri
Album art: Atif Ghauri

References

External links
Official Website

2005 albums
Noori albums
Urdu-language albums